Ibrahima Sory Sankhon (born 1 January 1996) is a Guinean footballer, who currently plays as a midfielder for RWD Molenbeek.

International career

International goals
Scores and results list Guinea's goal tally first.

References

External links 
 

1996 births
Living people
Susu people
Guinean footballers
Guinean expatriate footballers
Guinea international footballers
Association football midfielders
Santoba FC players
Horoya AC players
Sint-Truidense V.V. players
R.W.D. Molenbeek players
Guinée Championnat National players
Belgian Pro League players
Guinean expatriate sportspeople in Belgium
Expatriate footballers in Belgium
Guinea A' international footballers
2016 African Nations Championship players
2018 African Nations Championship players